The Canadian Journal of Surgery is a bimonthly peer-reviewed open access medical journal covering surgery. It was established in 1957 and is published by the Canadian Medical Association. The current editors-in-chief are Edward J. Harvey and Chad Ball.  The journal is sponsored by the Canadian Association of General Surgeons, Canadian Society for Vascular Surgery, Canadian Association of Thoracic Surgeons, and Canadian Society of Surgical Oncology.

History 
The journal was established as a result of a collaboration between Canadian departments of surgery, the Royal College of Physicians and Surgeons of Canada, and the Canadian Medical Association. In 1957, leading surgical groups asked the Canadian Medical Association to undertake the publishing of the journal. The founding editorial board consisted of the chairs of surgery at the 12 medical schools in Canada at the time. The president of the Royal College of Physicians and Surgeons of Canada chaired the board. The first issue was published on 1 October 1957. The Royal College of Physicians and Surgeons of Canada subsidized the journal until 1991 when it withdrew in favor of its own journal, Annals of the Royal College of Physicians and Surgeons of Canada. Jean Couture then arranged for the Canadian Association of General Surgeons to become the major sponsor of the journal.  Currently the Canadian Journal of Surgery, at 60 years of continuous publication, is the longest surviving journal of record of surgery in 300 years of organised surgery in Canada.

Citation record 
Journal Citation Reports shows that as of the end of 2016, the Canadian Journal of Surgery had published 5917 citable articles. The average citation per article was 6.9 so that its Impact Factor increased yearly from 0.5 in 2006 to 2.544 in 2017. The journal's h-index is 55 with a normalized Eigenfactor score of 0.42.

Editors-in-chief
The following persons are or have been editor-in-chief of the journal:
 Robert M. Janes, 1957–1964
 Frederick G. Kergin, 1964–1972
 Lloyd D. MacLean, 1972–1992
 C. Barber Mueller, 1972–1992
 Roger G. Keith, 1992–1998
 Jonathan Larmonth Meakins, 1992–2003
 James P. Waddell, 1998–2011
 Garth L. Warnock, 2003–2013
 Edward Harvey, 2011–present
 Vivian C McAlister, 2013–2019
Chad Ball, 2019–present

References

External links

Open access journals
Publications established in 1957
Bimonthly journals
Multilingual journals
Surgery journals